Akaash Bhatia (born 1 May 1983 in Loughborough, England) is a British-Indian featherweight professional boxer. He is the first ever professional British-Sikh boxer and the current British Southern area featherweight champion.

Professional career
Bhatia turned professional in May 2006 in York Hall, Bethnal Green, London. In his debut Bhatia defeated Kristian Laight on points over four rounds. He went on to win his next 11 straight fights before he fought for his first title which was the vacant British Southern area featherweight title. This fight came in November 2008 against Marc Callaghan at the Robin Park Centre in Wigan and Bhatia won the fight with a second round knockout of Callaghan.

Akaash lost his last fight, an eliminator for the British title to Jamie Arthur on points. He later separated from his trainer and now trains with Jimmy Tibbs at the TKO gym. He is set to return to the ring in January.

References

External links
 
 Official Akaash Bhatia website

1983 births
Living people
British male boxers
British people of Indian descent
British people of Punjabi descent
British Sikhs
English people of Indian descent
English people of Punjabi descent
English Sikhs
English male boxers
Featherweight boxers
Sportspeople from Loughborough